Northey Island is an island in the estuary of the River Blackwater, Essex. It is linked to the south bank of the river by a causeway, covered for two hours either side of high tide.  The island is approximately 1 mile (2 km) to the east of Maldon, Essex and 1 mile (2 km) to the west of Osea Island.

The Battle of Maldon, 991 is believed to have taken place on the causeway and the south bank of the Blackwater near the island. At that time the causeway is thought to have been half as long as it is presently – 120 yards rather than 240 yards today.

Significant land reclamation was carried out by the Dutch contractor Nicholas Van Cropenrough in the early 18th century; he enwalled marshland to significantly enlarge the island but the walls were breached by the sea and the land returned to marshland on 29 November 1897.

In 1923 Northey was bought by the writer and campaigner Norman Angell; in 1933 he was awarded the Nobel Peace Prize.

The whole island and part of the bank near the causeway are now a national nature reserve.
Northey is home to diverse birdlife and this is reflected in the place name 'Awl Creek' which perpetuates the traditional Essex dialect word for the Avocet.

At one time Northey was home to more species than it is now. The island was one of the last southern strongholds of the raven, the last bird being taken from the Ladies grove in 1888.

It is uninhabited apart from the warden. The island is owned by the National Trust and can be visited by arrangement with the warden. It is one of 43 (unbridged) tidal islands which can be walked to from the British mainland and one of six such tidal islands in Essex.

References

External links
 Google Maps satellite image of Northey Island

Islands of Essex
Tidal islands of England
Maldon District
National Trust properties in Essex